The OFC U-20 Championship 1986 was a soccer tournament held at the Mount Smart Stadium in Auckland, New Zealand. It also served as qualification for the 1987 FIFA World Youth Championship.

Teams
The following teams entered the tournament:

 
 
 
  (host)

Matches

Qualification to World Youth Championship
The tournament winner qualified for the 1987 FIFA World Youth Championship.

External links
Results by RSSSF

1986
Under 20
1986 Ofc U-20 Championship
1986 in New Zealand association football
1986 in Australian soccer
1986–87 in Israeli football
1986 in Taiwanese football
Association football in Auckland
1986 in youth association football